Doris sticta is a species of sea slug, a dorid nudibranch, a marine gastropod mollusk in the family Dorididae.

Distribution
This species was described from Plymouth, Devon, England. It has been reported from Ireland south to the Mediterranean Sea.

References

Dorididae
Gastropods described in 1923